Jean-Luc Arribart (born 9 March 1955) is a French former professional footballer who played for Rennes, Stade Lavallois, Stade Reims, AS Nancy and US Orléans as a defender.

References

1955 births
Living people
French footballers
Stade Rennais F.C. players
Stade Lavallois players
Stade de Reims players
AS Nancy Lorraine players
Ligue 1 players
Ligue 2 players
Footballers from Rennes
US Orléans players
Association football defenders